Enrique Oyarzún Mondaca (born 20 June 1860–19 August 1849) was a Chilean politician, lawyer and teacher of Spanish language who served as President of the Senate of Chile.

External links
 BCN Profile

1860 births
1949 deaths
People from Vallenar
Chilean people of Basque descent
Radical Party of Chile politicians
Deputies of the XXXII Legislative Period of the National Congress of Chile
Deputies of the XXXIII Legislative Period of the National Congress of Chile
Presidents of the Senate of Chile
Senators of the XXXV Legislative Period of the National Congress of Chile
University of Chile alumni